The men's 1500 metres event at the 2019 European Athletics U23 Championships was held in Gävle, Sweden, at Gavlehof Stadium Park on 11 and 13 July.

Medalists

Results

Qualifying rounds 
Thursday, July 11, 2019, 13:00 CET

Qualification rule: First 4 (Q) and the next 4 fastest (q) qualified for the semifinals.

Final

Thursday, July 13, 2019, 12:20 CET

References

1500 metres
1500 metres at the European Athletics U23 Championships